The Italy men's national basketball team is scheduled to play at the 2020 Summer Olympics in Tokyo in July 2021.

Overview 
Italy qualified to the Olympics after an unexpected win against Serbia during the Qualifying Tournament. 

Only Danilo Gallinari was added to the team who replaced Awudu Abass.

Italy qualified to the playoff stage losing only against Australia in the qualifying stage. They lost against France in the quarterfinals and ended the competition in the 5th position.

Timeline 
 4 July: Italy wins over Serbia 102–95 and qualifies to the 2020 Summer Olympics.
 6 July: Coach Sacchetti submits the list of 12 players that will go to the Olympics.
 12 July: The national team starts the preparation in Rome.
 25 July: Italy wins 92-82 against Germany.
 28 July: Italy loses 83-86 against Australia.
 31 July: Italy wins 80-71 against Nigeria and qualifies to the playoffs.
 3 August: Italy loses 75-84 against France and ends the Olympics at the 5th position.

Kit 
Supplier: Spalding

Roster 
The following 12 players were called by coach Meo Sacchetti for the Olympics.

Depth chart

Staff 
After the EuroBasket 2022 qualification tournament the staff team was updated: Piero Bucchi, Paolo Galbiati and Riccardo Fois were hired as assistant coaches and replaced Massimo Maffezzoli and Paolo Conti. Only Emanuele Molin was confirmed amongst the assistant coaches.

Source:

Olympic play

Preliminary round

Germany v Italy

Italy v Australia

Italy v Nigeria

Knockout stage

Italy v France

Statistics

Individual statistics

Individual game highs 

Notes
  at least 5 attempts

Team game highs

References

External links

Italy men's OQT basketball team profile on FIBA

Italy men's national basketball team by year
2021–22 in Italian basketball